Jamaican posses, often referred to simply as posses, are a loose coalition of Jamaican gangs, based predominantly in Kingston, London, New York City and Toronto, first being involved in drugs and arms trafficking in the early 1980s. Jamaican posses have links to the main Jamaican political parties, the Jamaica Labour Party (JLP) and the People's National Party (PNP).

The JLP posses dominate the west and south of Kingston and other smaller towns, while the PNP posses are mainly found in the eastern and central side; there are a few that state they are not allied to either political party. These are often in the northern slums of downtown Kingston. In the United Kingdom, these Jamaican gangsters would be referred to as yardies in reference to people who lived in "government yards" ("yard" is a Jamaican slang for home and surrounding areas). "Yardie" is an adjective describing any one from Jamaica in the aftermath of Hurricane Charlie, which hit Jamaica in 1951. They are strongly populated in London and are specifically known to have occupied and operate in Brixton, Harlesden, Tottenham, Hackney and Peckham among other areas.

Violence 
Jamaican Posse members are known for gun battles with the police and drive-by shootings in disputes with rival gangs over drug turf, as well as for ritualized murders of members who "rip off" profits on drugs.

Posse members have little regard for public safety or human life. As part of their code, extreme violence is directed at anyone they feel has disrespected them or is in their way. Once in prison, however, their violence is savage but not regular. The alleged head of the One Order Gang, Andrew "Bun Man" Hope, was murdered in Spanish Town on 8 February 2006, which sparked a riot the following day.

See also
Crime in Jamaica

References

Further reading

External links 
 
 
 

Yardies
Politics of Jamaica
Jamaican diaspora
Organized crime by ethnic or national origin
Transnational organized crime
Organized crime groups in Canada
Gangs in Toronto
Organized crime groups in Jamaica
Organized crime groups in the United States
Gangs in Florida
Gangs in New York City